German(s) may refer to:

 Germany (of or related to)
Germania (historical use)
 Germans, citizens of Germany, people of German ancestry, or native speakers of the German language
 For citizens of Germany, see also German nationality law
Germanic peoples (Roman times)
 German language
any of the Germanic languages
 German cuisine, traditional foods of Germany

People 
 German (given name)
 German (surname)
 Germán, a Spanish name

Places 

 German (parish), Isle of Man
 German, Albania, or Gërmej
 German, Bulgaria
 German, Iran
 German, North Macedonia
 German, New York, U.S.
 Agios Germanos, Greece

Other uses
 German (mythology), a South Slavic mythological being
 Germans (band), a Canadian rock band
 "German" (song), a 2019 song by No Money Enterprise
 The German, a 2008 short film
 "The Germans", an episode of Fawlty Towers
 The German, a nickname for Congolese rebel André Kisase Ngandu

See also 
 Germanic (disambiguation)
 Germany (disambiguation)
 Germanus (disambiguation)
 Germen (disambiguation)
 Germain (disambiguation)
 Germaine (disambiguation)
 Germantown (disambiguation)
 Germen (disambiguation)
 Germane, a simple chemical compound of germanium and hydrogen

Language and nationality disambiguation pages